Paul Mattick Jr. (born 1944) is the son of German emigres Paul Mattick Sr. (1904-1981) and Ilse (Hamm) Mattick (1919-2009).

He was involved in the council communist group Root and Branch, which sporadically published a magazine/pamphlet series, starting in 1969. Other members included Jeremy Brecher, Alice Comack, Martin Comack, Frieda Cyker,  Peter St Clair, Elizabeth Long, William Russell, Elizabeth Jones, George Scialabba, and Peter Rachleff. The group also sponsored public meetings; speakers included Ralph Miliband, Christian Wolff, Cornelius Castoriadis, Richard Lewontin, Frank Marquart, Paul Mattick, and others.

Mattick obtained his PhD in philosophy from Harvard in 1981, and taught philosophy at the New England Conservatory of Music, Bennington College, and Adelphi University.

He was the editor of the International Journal of Political Economy, and is the author of Social Knowledge: An Essay on the Nature and Limits of Social Science (1986, 2d ed. 2020), Art in Its Time: Theories and Practices of Modern Aesthetics (2003), Business as Usual: The Economic Crisis and the Failure of Capitalism (2011), and Theory as Critique: Essays on Capital (2018). He has been the Field Notes (politics) editor of the Brooklyn Rail (www.brooklynrail.org) since 2014.

References

External links
 Adelphi University: Faculty & Staff
 In Conversation: The Economic Crisis in Fact and Fiction: Paul Mattick with John Clegg and Aaron Benanav, The Brooklyn Rail
 

1944 births
American anti-capitalists
Marxist theorists
American communists
American Marxists
Harvard University alumni
Adelphi University faculty
Council communists
Philosophers of art
Living people